Grassland is a  historic house at Annapolis Junction, Anne Arundel County, Maryland.  It was built in 1853, and is a three-part brick structure constructed in a telescoping manner. Other structures on the property were erected between 1852 and 1854 by enslaved people: the one-story frame slave house with brick-nogged walls; a small stone smokehouse; the remains of a summer kitchen; and a frame harness shed, storage shed, and the ruins of a bank barn.

It was listed on the National Register of Historic Places in 1984.

As of January 2023, the property is overgrown with weeds and tall grass. The buildings located here at this site also appear to be in total disrepair.

References

External links
, including photo from 1984, at Maryland Historical Trust

Houses on the National Register of Historic Places in Maryland
Houses in Anne Arundel County, Maryland
Houses completed in 1854
Plantation houses in Maryland
National Register of Historic Places in Anne Arundel County, Maryland